The Brotherhood of Justice is a 1986 American television action film starring Keanu Reeves, Billy Zane, Kiefer Sutherland, and Lori Loughlin.

Overview
The movie is based on actual events that occurred at Paschal High School in Fort Worth, Texas, in 1984. The vigilante group called themselves "The Legion of Doom". The movie was filmed in Santa Cruz County, California. Some locations used were Aptos High School in Aptos, California, Downtown Watsonville, California, the Santa Cruz Beach Boardwalk, and various beaches in the area around Santa Cruz, California.

Plot
The eponymous "Brotherhood of Justice" begins as a well-intentioned attempt by students to stamp out violence and drugs in their high school, but this "solution" gradually becomes worse than the original problem. As the Brotherhood's targets expand to include all who irritate them for any reason, the group's actions escalate to arson and attempted murder. Its original leader, Derek, seeing what the group has become, turns against his comrades.

Cast
 Keanu Reeves as Derek
 Lori Loughlin as Christie
 Kiefer Sutherland as Victor Parks
 Joe Spano as Bob Grootemat
 Darren Dalton as Scottie
 Evan Mirand as Mule
 Don Michael Paul as Collin
 Gary Riley as Barnwell
 Billy Zane as Les
 Danny Nucci as Willie
 Danny De La Paz as Carlos
 Jim Haynie as Sheriff
 Sean Sullivan as Pastey
 Perla Walter as Maria

References

External links
 

1986 television films
1986 films
ABC network original films
American action television films
American thriller television films
American drama television films
1980s crime drama films
American vigilante films
Films directed by Charles Braverman
Films scored by Brad Fiedel
1986 action thriller films
1980s vigilante films
1980s English-language films
1980s American films